Harrison High School (also known as Farmington Harrison) was a four-year secondary institution located in Farmington Hills, Michigan in Oakland County, MI. It was part of the Farmington Public School District. The school system serves students from the cities of Farmington and Farmington Hills, and a portion of West Bloomfield Township.

Harrison High School's mission was “to develop students to be caring and engaged learners who make informed decisions as they become internationally minded in their stewardship of the world and its resources." Harrison's mascot was the Hawk and its colors are green and gold.

In March 2016, the Farmington school board announced that the school was to close following the 2018-19 academic year, citing lower student populations in the city of Farmington Hills.

History
Harrison High School opened in September 1970 with Freshman, Sophomore and Junior classes. The Juniors were the first graduating class in June 1972. The school is named for Gerald V. Harrison who was superintendent of Farmington Public Schools from 1957 to 1967, a period of dramatic growth in the school district. Harrison was the third high school in the district, and the only one with a Freshman class.

The school closed at the end of the 2018–2019 school year. The school was purchased by the city and is being developed into a recreation and performing arts center named The Hawk in tribute to the school. Construction began in fall 2019 and the center opened on June 7, 2021.

Academics

International Baccalaureate
Starting in the 2013-2014 school year, students had the opportunity to take IB classes at Harrison High School.  Prior to this, students wishing to obtain an IB diploma had to attend the International Academy in Bloomfield Hills.

Test scores
The State of Michigan publishes the ACT test scores for all of the schools in the state. The scores for Harrison are as follows:

Notable alumni

Aaron Burbridge - former NFL wide receiver 
Alex DeBrincat - right winger for the NHL’s Ottawa Senators
Devin Funchess - tight end for the Detroit Lions
Al Jean - writer, show-runner for cartoon series The Simpsons
Michael Ojemudia, football player
Drew Stanton - former NFL quarterback for the Arizona Cardinals and Cleveland Browns
Khalid Kareem, defensive end for the Cincinnati Bengals and formerly Notre Dame

References

External links
 
 Farmington Public Schools website

Public high schools in Michigan
Educational institutions established in 1970
Schools in Farmington Hills, Michigan
High schools in Oakland County, Michigan
1970 establishments in Michigan
Educational institutions disestablished in 2019
2019 disestablishments in Michigan